Musselroe Bay is a rural locality and body of water in the local government area of Dorset in the North-east region of Tasmania. The 2016 census determined a population of 40 for the state suburb of Musselroe Bay.

History
The locality was gazetted as Poole in 1968, and changed to Musselroe Bay in 2001.

Geography
Banks Strait forms the northern boundary, and the Great Musselroe River is the western boundary. Musselroe Bay (the body of water) is an inlet of Great Musselroe Bay, which is an inlet of Banks Strait, a channel at the eastern end of Bass Strait.

Road infrastructure
The C845 route (Musselroe Road) enters from the south-west and runs through to the north-east.

References

Localities of Dorset Council (Australia)
Towns in Tasmania
Bays of Tasmania